Ardenis is a village in the Amasia Municipality of the Shirak Province of Armenia.

History 
The village had a mixed Armenian–Azerbaijani population. During the Nagorno-Karabakh conflict, the Azerbaijani residents left for Azerbaijan.

Demographics
According to 1912 publication of the Caucasian Calendar, 335 people, mainly Karapapaks, lived in village Gollu of Kars Okrug of Kars Oblast.

Statistical Committee of Armenia reported its population was 177 in 2010, up from 132 at the 2001 census.

The population of the village since 1897 is as follows:

References 

Communities in Shirak Province
Populated places in Shirak Province